The Asia/Oceania Zone was one of the three zones of the regional Davis Cup competition in 1991.

In the Asia/Oceania Zone there were two different tiers, called groups, in which teams competed against each other to advance to the upper tier.

Group I
Winners in Group I advanced to the World Group Qualifying Round, along with losing teams from the World Group first round. The winner of the preliminary round joined the remaining teams in the main draw first round, while the losing team was relegated to the Asia/Oceania Zone Group II in 1992.

Participating nations

Draw

  relegated to Group II in 1992.

  and  advance to World Group Qualifying Round.

Preliminary round

Thailand vs. India

First round

India vs. Indonesia

Japan vs. Philippines

Second round

India vs. South Korea

Philippines vs. China

Group II
The winner in Group II advanced to the Asia/Oceania Zone Group I in 1992.

Participating nations

Draw

  promoted to Group I in 1992.

First round

Malaysia vs. Saudi Arabia

Bahrain vs. Bangladesh

Sri Lanka vs. Syria

Singapore vs. Kuwait

Second round

Jordan vs. Pakistan

Malaysia vs. Chinese Taipei

Bangladesh vs. Sri Lanka

Singapore vs. Hong Kong

Third round

Chinese Taipei vs. Pakistan

Hong Kong vs. Sri Lanka

Fourth round

Chinese Taipei vs. Hong Kong

References

External links
Davis Cup official website

Davis Cup Asia/Oceania Zone
Asia Oceania Zone